The Chesed Shel Emeth Cemetery is a Jewish graveyard located in University City, Missouri, an inner ring suburb of St. Louis.

History
The cemetery has been operated since 1893 by the Chesed Shel Emeth Society. Jewish immigrants from Russia founded the Chesed Shel Emeth Society in order to bury their deceased with familiar rites after the immigrants found rituals and traditions of the local Orthodox synagogues unfamiliar. 
In the 1960s Chesed Shel Emeth congregation purchased a thirty acres piece of land in Chesterfield, again following the westward movement of the Jewish community. Called the White Road Cemetery it has the potentiality for growth over the next 200 years to hold the entire St. Louis Jewish population.

2017 Desecration

A vandal toppled and overturned 154 gravestones at the cemetery in February 2017.  The vandalism drew national attention and occurred during a period when anonymous threats were being made to attack Jewish institutions nationwide. The next month, the FBI and Israeli authorities arrested a Jewish teenager who was responsible for many of the bomb threats. Over a year after the cemetery vandalism, on April 25, 2018, St. Louis County prosecutors announced that they had charged a local man in connection to the February 2017 vandalism. Prosecutors stated that the man reported being drunk and angry at friends during the vandalism and that he appeared to have no antisemitic motivation.

References

External links
 

Jewish cemeteries in Missouri
1893 establishments in Missouri
Cemeteries in St. Louis
Cemetery vandalism and desecration
21st-century attacks on synagogues and Jewish communal organizations in the United States